Martial law is the imposition of military rule.

Martial law may also refer to:

 Martial Law (TV series), a late 1990s television series
 Martial Law (1991 film), the 1991 film starring David Carradine
 Martial Law 2: Undercover, 1991 film

Marshal or Marshall law may refer to:

 Marshal Law (comics)
 Marshal Law, the 1996 film starring Jimmy Smits
 Marshall Law (TV series), an Australian television series
 Marshall Law (Tekken), a character of the Tekken series

See also
 Marshall Plan, American initiative to aid Western Europe after World War II